Ataxia alboscutellata is a species of beetle in the family Cerambycidae. It was described by Warren Samuel Fisher in 1926. It is known from the Virgin Islands, Cuba and Puerto Rico.

References

Ataxia (beetle)
Beetles described in 1926